(Patrick) Maurice Burke Roche, 6th Baron Fermoy (born 11 October 1967), is a British businessman who holds a title in the Peerage of Ireland. He is the elder son of Edmund Roche, 5th Baron Fermoy, and his wife, Lavinia Pitman.

Life and career
He was educated at Eton College, and he served in the Blues and Royals. His postings included that of a Troop Leader at the Household Cavalry Mounted Regiment in Knightsbridge, London, carrying out Queen's Life Guard and state ceremonial duties, including state visits, the opening of Parliament by the Queen, the Lord Mayor's Show, the Garter Service at Windsor and the Queen's Birthday Parade on Horse Guards Parade. He completed a tour of Northern Ireland as a platoon commander attached to the Queen's Own Highlanders in 1990. He served for seven years, retiring at the rank of captain.

Lord Fermoy is a first cousin of Diana, Princess of Wales, and he attended her 1981 wedding to Charles, Prince of Wales. He was Page of Honour to Queen Elizabeth The Queen Mother between 1982 and 1984. He inherited the title of Baron Fermoy when his father died by suicide in 1984. In 2011, Lord and Lady Fermoy attended the royal wedding of Prince William to Catherine Middleton.

Lord Fermoy has developed a number of business interests since leaving the army. He is founder director of Oxford Street Connections, a mobile communications broker. He is co-partner of UK China Elite International, which brings together known and trusted individuals and businesses from China and the United Kingdom.

Marriage and children
On 26 March 1998, he married Tessa Fiona Kayll, daughter of Major David Pelham Kayll and his wife, Sheila Morrison.

They have two daughters:
 The Hon. Arabella Elizabeth Burke Roche, born 18 March 1999
 The Hon. Eliza Lavinia Burke Roche, born 9 November 2000

As Lord Fermoy has no sons, his heir presumptive is his younger brother, the Hon. Edmund Hugh Burke Roche.

Arms

References

1967 births
Living people
English people of Irish descent
English people of American descent
People educated at Eton College
Barons Fermoy
Maurice
Blues and Royals officers